William Parke (1873–1941) was an American film director of the silent era.

Selected filmography
 Prudence the Pirate (1916)
 Other People's Money (1916)
 The Shine Girl (1916)
 The Last of the Carnabys (1917)
 Miss Nobody (1917)
 The Cigarette Girl (1917)
 A Crooked Romance (1917)
 The Streets of Illusion (1917)
 The Mystery of the Double Cross (1917)
 Over the Hill (1917)
 Convict 993 (1918)
 The Yellow Ticket (1918)
 A Woman Who Understood (1920)
 The Paliser Case (1920)
 Out of the Storm (1920)
 Beach of Dreams (1921)
 Legally Dead (1923)
 The Clean Up (1923)
 A Million to Burn (1923)

References

Bibliography
 Munden, Kenneth White. The American Film Institute Catalog of Motion Pictures Produced in the United States, Part 1. University of California Press, 1997.

External links

1873 births
1941 deaths
American film directors
People from Bethlehem, Pennsylvania